Şotlanlı (also, Shotlanly and Shotulany) is a village in the Qubadli Rayon of Azerbaijan.

References 

Populated places in Qubadli District